Mark Jeffrey (born 1960s) is an Australian former professional tennis player.

Originally from Sydney, Jeffrey featured in the men's doubles main draw of the 1985 Australian Open. After competing briefly on tour he took up a scholarship to Mississippi State University and was an All-American in his freshman year. Named on the All-Southeast Conference team in all four seasons of collegiate tennis, he graduated in 1991 and later moved into coaching. He was head coach of the University of Louisiana men's team from 2009 to 2021.

References

External links
 
 

1960s births
Living people
Australian male tennis players
Australian tennis coaches
Tennis players from Sydney
Louisiana Ragin' Cajuns coaches
Mississippi State Bulldogs tennis players
College tennis coaches in the United States
20th-century Australian people
21st-century Australian people